Dream (Cadbury White in the UK) is a brand of white chocolate by Cadbury. It is no longer manufactured in the UK, though it is still manufactured in Australia, New Zealand, and South Africa. It is similar to a Milkybar, which is made by Nestlé. Some of the difference between it and Milkybar is that "Dream" uses real cocoa butter, is slimmer than the Milkybar, and the Milkybar uses puffed rice. Cadbury also released 'Cadbury White Giant Buttons' and plan to release 'Freddo White Treasures'.

The bar was relaunched in the UK in 2019 under a new name 'Cadbury White'.

History 
Dream was first launched in Australia and New Zealand in 2001. According to Cadbury, the product became one of the top five block chocolate brands in New Zealand and had driven growth in the overall chocolate market. In 2002, the product was launched in the United Kingdom and Canada and was featured as part of Cadbury’s sponsorship for Coronation Street. The bar was relaunched under a new name in the UK and Ireland in 2019 as 'Cadbury White'. It was sold exclusively at Asda and had poor reviews as of September 2019. In October 2019, Cadbury planned to release a special edition white christmas chocolate block in Australia. In May 2020 it was relaunched in the UK as part of the B&M Cadbury Australia Chocolate promotions it is sold along with Cadbury Dairy Milk Top Deck,Crispy Mint Creme, and Moro Bars and 2 flavours of the Cadbury Old Gold Bars (including Roast Almond and Peppermint) and later additions Cadbury Caramilk Bars and Cadbury Twirl Caramilk Bars and Australian Cadbury Dairy Milk Turkish Delight Bars were later added on sale and they are on sale at B&M, because according to B&M the Australian Cadbury Bars were the delicious products on sale.

See also
 List of chocolate bar brands

References

External links 
 Cadbury UK
B&M Stores - Cadbury Dream White Chocolate 180g

Australian confectionery
Cadbury brands
Food and drink introduced in 2001
Mondelez International brands
Chocolate bars